Sorina Maria Grozav (née Tîrcă; born 27 May 1999) is a Romanian handballer who plays for Rapid București.

In September 2018, she was included by EHF in a list of the 20 best young handballers to watch for the future.

International honours
EHF Cup:
Semifinalist: 2016
EHF European Under-17 Championship:
Fourth place: 2015

Individual awards
 Top Scorer of the EHF European Under-17 Championship: 2015 
 Top Scorer of the EHF European Under-19 Championship: 2017
 Gala Premiilor Handbalului Românesc Liga Națională Young Player of the Season: 2019

Personal life
She is the daughter of the handball legend Mariana Tîrcă.

She studied law at Transilvania University of Brașov. In May 2022, she married footballer Gheorghe Grozav.

References

1999 births
Living people
Sportspeople from Râmnicu Vâlcea
Romanian female handball players